Thomas Parrott may refer to:

 Thomas Alexander Parrott (1914–2007), American Central Intelligence Agency (CIA) officer
 Thomas H. Parrott (1836–1899), English musician
 Thomas Marc Parrott (1866–1960), American literary scholar
 Tom Parrott (Thomas William Parrott, 1868–1932), American baseball player